Kyoto Prefectural Police Soccer Club is a Japanese football club based in Kyoto. The club has played in Japan Soccer League Division 2. Currently plays in Japanese Prefectural Leagues.

External links
Football of Japan

Football clubs in Japan
Japan Soccer League clubs
Sports teams in Kyoto Prefecture
Police association football clubs in Japan